Jiao Junyan (born 6 May 1987) is a Chinese actress, best known for her role as Fang Huihui on When Larry Met Mary (2016) and has also starred in a number of films and television series, including Love Is Not Blind (2011), Editorial Department Story (2013), Lala's Shining Days (2013), Bunshinsaba 3 (2014), Noble Aspirations (2016), Medical Examiner Dr. Qin (2016), and Detective Dee (2017).

Early life and education
Jiao was born in Ma'anshan, Anhui, on May 6, 1987. She graduated from Beijing Film Academy, where she majored in acting.

Acting career
Jiao made her television debut in Newcomers to the Middle-Aged (2009).
Her first role in a movie came with the romance film Rest on Your Shoulder.

In 2010, she appeared in Tea House, a television adaptation based on the drama of the same name by Lao She. The same year, she starred in the spy drama Eternal Wave.

Jiao next starred in the romance television series Never Say Goodbye (2011). She played a supporting role in the war television series The Shengtianmen Gate.

In 2012, she was cast in the suspense drama Trapped. She had a cameo appearance in Lonely Army Hero, a war television series.

In 2013, she headlined two television series, Editorial Department Story and Lala's Shining Days. She rose to fame after portraying Ou Xiaomi in the romance television series Editorial Department Story. She became widely known to audiences with Lala's Shining Days, the sequel to 2010's Go Lala Go!.

Jiao was cast as Yuanyuan in the Ahn Byeong-ki's horror film Bunshinsaba 3 (2014), which premiered on July 4, 2014. The same year, she played a supporting role in the comedy film Breakup Buddies.

In 2015, Jiao played the female lead opposite Jing Chao in military drama Youth Assemble.

In 2016, Jiao played the role of Feng Huihui in Wen Zhang's film When Larry Met Mary, for which she received a Best Supporting Actress nomination at the 31st Golden Rooster Awards. 
She then played a key supporting role as Jin Ping'er in Noble Aspirations,  based on the fantasy novel Zhu Xian by Xiao Ding.

The same year Jiao starred in crime drama Medical Examiner Dr. Qin, opposite Zhang Ruoyun and Li Xian. The series gained over 1.5 billion views on Sohu TV, and earned praise for its storyline and performance. She then starred in the romance film Remembering Lichuan with Godfrey Gao, which received positive reviews.

In 2017, Jiao starred as Wu Zetian, reuniting her with co-star Ren Jialun, who played Di Renjie, in historical television series Detective Dee. She also starred in the female-centric romance drama Solaso Bistro.
The same year, she starred inntwo films, Goldbuster and Hanson and the Beast. She appeared as Ah Ping, a network host, in Sandra Ng's directorial debut Goldbuster. She also participated in Hanson and the Beast, a fantasy comedy film.

In 2018, Jiao starred in police drama Caught in the Heartbeat.

In 2019, Jiao was cast in the legal drama Perfect Evidence.

Filmography

Film

Television series

Awards and nominations

References

External links
 
 Jiao Junyan on Chinesemovie

 Jiao Junyan on Douban   
 Jiao Junyan on Mtime 

1987 births
People from Ma'anshan
Living people
Beijing Film Academy alumni
Chinese film actresses
Chinese television actresses
21st-century Chinese actresses
Actresses from Anhui